Bujta repa (sour turnip hot pot or pork with pickled grated turnips) is a Slovene national dish. It was mostly made in Prekmurje, the northeastern part of Slovenia. The expression bujta comes from the verb form bujti (to kill). The dish was originally relished in winter at pig slaughter or koline.

It was prepared from fatty parts of the pig's head, neck and skin, and sour turnips. It was necessary for bujta repa to be fatty and well larded. There was a rule that no steam should be seen rising from the dish. The colder the greasier, they believed. Now this custom is out of practise, since less lard is used.

Preparation
Cook fleshy pig bones in water about 30 minutes. Then add grated sour turnips, spices and let simmer. Add millet groats when turnips turn tender. When millet is cooked, make bright roux with chopped onions and red pepper powder. Add cold water and roux into millet. Beans (that have to be cooked separately) are also often added to bujta repa

References

External links
Official recipe

See also
Slovenian cuisine

Slovenian cuisine
Pork dishes